Brian Launders (born 8 June 1976) is an Irish former footballer who played as a midfielder. Born in Dublin, he began his career as a junior with Cherry Orchard in Ireland before moving to Australia to play for Croydon Kings. In 1993, he moved to England to play for Crystal Palace. He subsequently moved between a number of clubs in England, along with a spell in the Netherlands before eventually returning to Australia, where he finished his career.

Career

Sheffield United
A free agent, Launders joined Sheffield United on trial in the autumn of 1999.  Having been given a contract until the end of the season, he made his debut a few days later, coming on a substitute in a game against Stockport County on 20 November 1999.  His debut only lasted ten minutes as he was himself substituted when he picked up an injury following a collision with an opposition player.  When manager Adrian Heath was sacked shortly after, Launders was still suffering from concussion following his injury and was deemed unfit to undertake the medical required to finalise his contract and he was released.

References

External links

1976 births
Living people
Association footballers from Dublin (city)
Republic of Ireland association footballers
Association football midfielders
Crystal Palace F.C. players
Oldham Athletic A.F.C. players
Crewe Alexandra F.C. players
Derby County F.C. players
SC Veendam players
Colchester United F.C. players
Sheffield United F.C. players
Croydon Kings players
English Football League players
Eerste Divisie players
Premier League players
Cherry Orchard F.C. players